Sthree is a 1950 Malayalam-language film written by Thikkurissy Sukumaran Nair and directed by R. Velappan Nair.

Cast
 Thikkurissy Sukumaran Nair as Rajan
 Vaikom M. P. Mani as Madhu
 Aravindaksha Menon as Vijayan
 Omalloor Chellamma as Sushama
 Radhadevi as Sudha
 Sumathi as Mallika
 Raman Nair as Mammadan
 Kuriyathi Neelakanta Pillai as Nanu Pillai

External links
 Sthree at the Malayalam Movie Database

1950s Malayalam-language films